The mann (plural mannen) or man is a fairy chess piece that may move to any adjoining square. The mann is used in many chess variants. In this article's diagrams, the mann is represented by an inverted king.

Movement

The mann has the basic move of a king in chess: it may move to any adjoining square. It is otherwise treated as a normal chess piece (i.e. it can be captured and is not subject to check or checkmate). The mann is unable to castle. It is simply a ferz+wazir compound.

Value

In general, the mann is approximately equal in strength and value to the knight. The mann often takes a few moves to get properly  in the opening. It is effective at close proximity, where its striking power is considerable. Although it is rather slow, the mann is excellent at both attacking and defending nearby pieces and pawns, similar to the king. The mann reaches its peak strength during the endgame, in which its value is slightly more than a knight, despite being slightly less than a knight in the opening. It is possible to force checkmate with a mann and a king against a lone enemy king; since the enemy king cannot move to attack either, it is quite easy to box the king into a corner.

History

The mann is one of the most simply described chess pieces and as such has a long history and has gone by many names. A similar piece known as the dabbaba was described c. 950 in a form of chess on a 10×10 board. The mann is used in Courier chess, invented in the 12th century and commonly played until the 18th century.  Many chess variants have used the mann; modern instances include Quatrochess (as mann), Roman chess (as archer or chariot), and Knightmate (as commoner).

Examples
Each mann is represented by an inverted king in the following examples.

Notes

References

Bibliography

External links
 Roman Chess brief overview 
 Knightmate brief overview

Fairy chess pieces